St. James Episcopal Church is a parish church of the Episcopal Diocese of New York, located at 4526 Albany Post Road (U.S. Route 9) in Hyde Park, New York, across the street from the Vanderbilt Mansion National Historic Site. The church is associated with Franklin Delano Roosevelt, the 32nd President of the United States, whose family estate is located 2.7 miles south of the church. Roosevelt served in the vestry and as senior warden of the church, even during his presidency, and he, his wife Eleanor, and their family regularly attended service there whenever they were in Hyde Park.

Churchyard

The churchyard contains the graves or memorials of a variety of notables, including several members of Franklin Roosevelt's family.

Roosevelt family
James Roosevelt I (1828–1900), FDR's father
Rebecca Brien Howland Roosevelt (1831–1876), James' first wife
Sara Ann Delano Roosevelt (1854–1941), James' second wife, FDR's mother
James Roosevelt Roosevelt (1854–1927), son of James Roosevelt and Rebecca Howland, FDR's half-brother
Four of Franklin and Eleanor Roosevelt's children:
Anna Eleanor Roosevelt Dall Boettiger Halsted (1906–1975) and her third husband Dr. James Addison Halsted (1905–1984)
The first Franklin Delano Roosevelt, Jr. (March–November 1909)
The second Franklin Delano Roosevelt, Jr. (1914–1988)
John Aspinwall Roosevelt (1916–1981)

Other notables
Samuel Bard (1742–1821), personal physician to George Washington, founder of Columbia University College of Physicians and Surgeons
Elbridge Thomas Gerry (1837–1927), activist and reformer, grandson of Founding Father Elbridge Gerry
Francis G. Landon (1859–1947), soldier, politician, member of the New York State Assembly
Morgan Lewis (1754–1844), Governor of New York 1804–1807, colonel in the Continental Army during the Revolution, general in the United States Army during the War of 1812
Ogden Livingston Mills (1884–1937), Secretary of the Treasury under President Herbert Hoover
Nathaniel Pendleton (1756–1821), lawyer and judge, served as second to Alexander Hamilton during duel with Aaron Burr in 1804
Edmund Henry Pendleton (1788–1862), Dutchess County judge, U.S. Congressman from New York

References

External links

Church website

19th-century Episcopal church buildings
Episcopal church buildings in New York (state)
Gothic Revival architecture in New York (state)
Buildings and structures in Hyde Park, New York
Franklin D. Roosevelt